Madhab Raj Kharel (Nepali: माधव राज खरेल; born 1982) is a Nepali film director, actor, writer and producer.

Career 
Madhab Raj Kharel debuted in Nepali Film Industry through inscription and direction of the drama titled Janachetana (1998). He has produced and directed numerous television dramas like Kasto Yo Jiwan and Kashur (2002-2003) and Nepali language films like Kuineto (2018) which explores art, culture, tradition and language of far western region of Nepal, Birano Maya (2016), a silent movie Dhunge Yug (2009), a research based movie Dhunge Yug 2 (In search of civilization) (2016) etc. He won “Box Office Film Fare Award”, “Blockbuster Film Award” and “D-Cine Award for Best Director(Jury) (2010), all for his direction in Dhunge Yug and other international awards too.

He established a movie-producing company named “ Media and Entertainment Pvt. Ltd.” in 2008 A.D. He has produced and directed more than 2 dozens documentary from 2009-2015 namely Gadhimai, Gantabya Kusheshwor, Yatra Sefoksundo, Nepal Yatra, etc., and music videos in the same number, and also has scripted and directed many programs broadcast on Nepal Television, S.T.V., News24, etc. He has adapted the novel Durgamandu to the film of the same name which exposes and challenges malfunction, misconduct and superstition like Chhaupadi system, single woman, Bokshi (witch) system and other sort of social weaknesses existing in Far Western Region of Nepal.

Awards and honors

Awards

Honors

References 

1982 births
Living people
Nepalese film directors
Nepalese television directors
People from Kavrepalanchok District
21st-century Nepalese screenwriters
21st-century Nepalese film directors